István Román (born August 10, 1975) is a Hungarian politician, member of the National Assembly (MP) from Fidesz Szabolcs-Szatmár-Bereg County Regional List between 2010 and 2014.

Román was elected Vice President of the General Assembly of Szabolcs-Szatmár-Bereg County in 2009. He was a member of the Economic and Information Technology Committee from May 14, 2010 to May 5, 2014. He was appointed Deputy Secretary of State for Agricultural Vocational Training in June 2014. He held the position until 1 August 2017, when he was made Director of the Szabolcs-Szatmár-Bereg County Government Office.

References

1975 births
Living people
Fidesz politicians
Members of the National Assembly of Hungary (2010–2014)
People from Szabolcs-Szatmár-Bereg County